The Speedway Ekstraliga is the top division of motorcycle speedway in Poland. It has been called the "richest and most popular speedway league in the world", and attracts riders from all over the world. The Ekstraliga has the highest average attendances for any sport in Poland.

With the fall of communism in Poland in the 1990s and the resultant sharp increase in the value of the Złoty, the sport began to attract a wider range of star riders from other countries. The first of these was Denmark's Hans Nielsen.

In 2000, the First Division was renamed Ekstraliga, and the number of teams was reduced. Since 2015 the official sponsor of Ekstraliga is the Polish energy company PGE, which signed the financial contract for three consecutive seasons in 2021. The top division is called the PGE Ekstraliga.

2023 PGE Ekstraliga 
 WTS Wrocław
 Motor Lublin
 Stal Gorzów Wielkopolski
 Unia Leszno
 Włókniarz Częstochowa
 KS Toruń
 GKM Grudziądz
 Wilki Krosno

Teams

Ekstraliga Champions

References 

 
Speedway leagues
Professional sports leagues in Poland